Deborah Sara Santana (née King, born January 30, 1951) is a peace and social justice activist for women and people of color, business manager and author. She is the former wife of musician Carlos Santana.

Early life and education
Santana is the daughter of the blues musician Saunders King and Jo Frances King (née Willis). Santana graduated from the California Institute of Integral Studies and holds a Master of Arts in Philosophy and Religion with a Concentration in Women’s Spirituality.

Career
From 1994 to 2007, Santana was Vice-President and COO of Santana Management, which involved working in management of her husband's band.

Philanthropy
As a philanthropist, Santana founded Do a Little, a non-profit which seeks to empower children and underprivileged women, in 2008. Santana has also served as a trustee for ANSA (Artists for a New South Africa) and the Smithsonian Institution. She is on the board of directors of the Violence Intervention program in Los Angeles and is a First Century Leader of the Smithsonian American Women's History Initiative, as well as a member of the Advisory Committee. Santana is also a founding donor of the Smithsonian National Museum of African American History and Culture.

In 2005, Santana published Space Between the Stars: My Journey to an Open Heart, a memoir detailing her biracial upbringing as a child of African-American and European-American parents, and her marriage to Carlos. In 2018, Santana edited and co-published the anthology All the Women in My Family Sing: Women Write the World: Essays on Equality, Justice, and Freedom (Nothing But the Truth So Help Me God), a collection of poems and stories written by 69 women of color. She has also contributed to the anthologies Tutu As I Know Him: On a Personal Note (2006), Nothing But the Truth So Help Me God (2012), Life Moments for Women (2012), and 20 Years - Chokecherries Anniversary Edition (2013).

Santana is credited as a producer on five short documentary films focusing on the Daraja Academy, a free secondary boarding school for high performing girls in need in Kenya, and the work of non-profit partners in South Africa. Four of these films were directed by Emmy Award-winner Barbara Rick. Santana continues to support the Daraja Academy both financially and by using her celebrity to bring awareness.

Personal life
Santana has three children with Carlos Santana. Salvador Santana is a songwriter, band leader, and instrumentalist; Stella Santana, a singer/songwriter/performer; and Angelica Santana, a writer, archivist, and film producer.

References 

1951 births
Living people
African-American activists
20th-century African-American women
20th-century African-American people
21st-century African-American women
21st-century American memoirists
American book editors
American documentary film producers
American film producers
American publishers (people)
American social justice activists
American women memoirists
American women non-fiction writers
Family of Carlos Santana
Film producers from California
People from San Francisco
American women documentary filmmakers